Syzygium guehoi is a species of plant in the family Myrtaceae. It is endemic to Mauritius.  Its natural habitat is rocky areas.

References

guehoi
Endemic flora of Mauritius
Critically endangered plants
Taxonomy articles created by Polbot